Alice Palmer may refer to:

 Alice Freeman Palmer (1855–1902), American educator
SS Alice F. Palmer, a Liberty ship 
 Alice Palmer (politician) (born 1939), Illinois politician and educator
 Alice Palmer (designer), Scottish dress and handbag designer
 Alice May Palmer, New Zealand public servant